Quarrelwood Castle was a castle located about  north and west of Elgin, Moray, Scotland,  near Spynie, Moray in Scotland.

History

Built in the 14th century by Robert Lauder of the Bass, Justiciar of Scotia. The castle passed by marriage of Robert's daughter Ann to Robert Chisholm. The castle later passed via the marriage of Muriel, daughter of John Chisholm and Catherine Bisset, to Alexander Sutherland, 3rd of Duffus in the 15th century. The castle was briefly held by William Duff of Dipple,  before the castle passed by the marriage of his daughter to William Sutherland of Roscommon.

Quarrelwood was occupied until the mid 18th century, afterwards becoming ruinous and was dismantled and used for building materials in the area.

References

Clan Chisholm
Clan Sutherland
Former castles in Scotland